Dillon Ifunanya Chukwu Hoogewerf (born 27 February 2003) is a Dutch professional footballer who plays as a winger for Borussia Mönchengladbach II.

Early life 
Hoogewerf was born to a Dutch father and a Nigerian mother, making him eligible for both the Netherlands and Nigeria national team.

Club career 
In the 2018–19 season, Hoogewerf tallied ten goals and six assists, while averaging a goal every 167 minutes for the Ajax U17 team.

On 1 June 2019, Hoogewerf announced that he was moving from Ajax to Manchester United after rejecting a contract offer from the Dutch club. He was Ole Gunnar Solskjær's first signing as Manchester United manager. He signed his first professional contract in March 2020.

On 28 November 2020, Hoogewerf scored his first hat-trick for United in a 4–1 victory over the Newcastle U18s.

On 31 January 2022, Hoogewerf was signed by Borussia Mönchengladbach for its reserve team.

References 

Living people
2003 births
Dutch people of Nigerian descent
Dutch footballers
Association football wingers
Manchester United F.C. players